The Calhoun School is a progressive, co-educational, independent school on New York City's Upper West Side, serving students from Pre-K through 12th grade.  Founded in 1896, the school currently has approximately 600 students, housed in two separate buildings.

History
In 1896, The Calhoun School was founded by Laura Jacobi as the Jacobi School in a brownstone at 158–160 West 80th Street.  Miss Jacobi came to America from Germany with the help of her uncle, Dr. Abraham Jacobi, professor of pediatrics at New York Medical College and Columbia. Through her uncle and her aunt, Miss Jacobi was exposed to a progressive circle committed to women's rights, community health and civil reform. Initially, Miss Jacobi began her program as a "brother-and-sister" school, counting among its first students the son and daughter of Franz Boas, one of the founders of American cultural anthropology. It gradually evolved into a girls' school, attracting the daughters of socially prominent Jewish families, including Peggy Guggenheim, the children of the Morgenthaus and the Strausses. The school's nonsectarian curriculum emphasized languages and history. Eleanor Steiner Gimbel '14 remembered Miss Jacobi's commitment to civil liberties and her "teaching of race understanding as one of the high points of her school days."

In 1916, Laura Jacobi chose Mary Edwards Calhoun to succeed her as headmistress.  A member of a Philadelphia Quaker family, Miss Calhoun was a former editor of the Women's Page at the Herald Tribune as well as a teacher at various schools before coming to The Jacobi School.  Ella Cannon, a former employee with the National Women's Suffrage Publishing Company, was hired to teach economics and, in 1923, was named co-headmistress. The school was renamed after its beloved headmistress, Mary Calhoun, in 1924. In 1939, Miss Calhoun incorporated the school as a non-profit institution. She retired in 1942; Miss Levis continued as Head until her retirement in 1946, after which Elizabeth Parmelee and Beatrice Cosmey became co-headmistresses—remaining in that position until their retirement in 1969. Philip (Pem) E. McCurdy was selected by the Board to be the first male Head of School, and was given a mandate to guide Calhoun's transformation into a fully coeducational school (1971). Pem's initiatives were completed under the leadership of Eugene Ruth, who completed Calhoun's transformation to a progressive educational institution dedicated to "learner-centered instruction and independent learning" based on an understanding of "individual differences" in learning styles.

The building opened at 433 West End Avenue at 81st Street in the spring of 1975, and the first coed class graduated that June. Under Head of School Steve Nelson, a major capital campaign was completed in 2004 that added five floors to the main building; another construction project completed in 2014 redesigned the school's facade, lobby, library and learning resource center, and expanded the lunchroom. Calhoun's 11th Head of School, Steven Solnick, joined the school in August 2017.

Athletics
Calhoun offers an extensive physical education program that promotes team play and individual fitness, and a full roster of interscholastic sports under the auspices of the New York City Athletic League (NYCAL). The Girls' Volleyball JV and Varsity teams, in particular, have been a consistent, dominant force in the league, capturing NYCAL league and championship tournament titles over the course of ten consecutive years. Basketball teams have frequently qualified for NYCAL championships and state tournaments, with several standout athletes leading the helm.  Students also excel in track-and-field: their performance frequently takes them to the New York State Championships, where they've taken medals in the 100- and 400-meter races as well as the 4x100 meter relay.

Facilities
Classes for Calhoun's preschoolers—young 3s (entering at 2 years 8 months) through second graders—are held in the Robert L. Beir building on West 74th Street between Amsterdam Avenue and Columbus Avenue. The building, a renovated five-story townhouse, is home to one of Calhoun's two theaters; its own gym and rooftop garden; large, bright classrooms; a library and STEAM Discovery Lab; and an outdoor play terrace.

Grades 3–12 are taught in the Main Building, located at 433 West End Avenue, at 81st Street. Originally completed in 1975, the building was designed by Costas Machlouzarides. When first built, the iconic building was frequently referred to as the "TV" school because of the design of the façade. With a major renovation in 2004 that added four new floors, and a second street-level renovation completed in 2014, the school building's unique design was modernized while still retaining its 1970s roots.

Instead of halls and classrooms, the first three academic floors are divided into classroom areas by bookshelves, dividers and flexible walls.

The September 2004 renovation added to the original building:
 A full-sized gym and weight room
 A performing arts center with theater and music rehearsal rooms
 Three fully equipped science labs
 A greatly expanded art studio with kiln, darkroom and woodshop
 An eco-friendly Green Roof Learning Center that also provides programmable space for educational purposes, light recreation, and the school's herb and vegetable garden (for the school's nutritious lunch program).

Calhoun completed a 3-month renovation project in September 2014 that included expansion of the first floor for a kitchen facility and multi-purpose lunch room/events space; and renovation of the ground floor for the school's library resource center and offices.

In the summer of 2022, the 4th and 7th floors were renovated.

Architecture

Once called the television building because of its former façade, Calhoun's original building at 81st Street was completed in 1975 and designed by Costas Machlouzarides. In 2000, The Calhoun School hired New York-based architecture firm FXFOWLE to design a four-story addition, which was completed for the 2004 school year. DesignShare, a journal of educational facilities planning, called the four-floor addition a "courageous design," with special mention of the School's Green Roof as "an innovation in the architecture for learning." The Green Roof and FXFOWLE were named DesignShare's recipients of a 2007 Merit Award—one of only seven recipients worldwide to receive the award. In fact, the Green Roof has attracted international attention and acclaim, with architects and educators coming from as far away as Japan, Brazil, Italy, Ireland, and Great Britain to see how the school has taken a leadership position in green architecture and sustainability.  Ten years later, in the summer of 2014, the school began another 3-month renovation project of the 81st Street building with FXFOWLE, to expand the interior of the first floor by enclosing an outdoor plaza. The result had a significant—and positive—impact on the face of the iconic building while maintaining the "overhang" effect that—when first built in the 1970s—people claimed looked like a Brownie camera flash cube or a television set.

Performing arts
Calhoun's Mary Lea Johnson Performing Arts Center is used for student productions, assemblies, and school events, as well as for Calhoun's Performing Arts Series, open to the public.  The yearly series hosts professional Children's Theater, Music Concerts, Dance, Documentary Films, and Town Hall Meetings and Lectures, all at nominal cost and all open to the public. Students and faculty have the added benefit of meeting with many of these artists and guest speakers prior to the events, in class or specially arranged assembly programs.

Alumni

 Toby Emmerich, 1981, producer, film executive, and screenwriter 
 Elinor S. Gimbel, former progressive leader and women's rights activist
 Peggy Guggenheim, 1915, former arts patron
 Cooper Hoffman, 2021, actor
 Kristin Richardson Jordan, 2005, New York City council member
 David Karp, Tumblr founder
 Nora Benjamin Kubie, 1916, former author
 Elinor Morgenthau, former Democratic Party activist and wife of Henry Morgenthau Jr.
 Suzi Oppenheimer, former New York State Senator
 Jordan Peele, 1997, comedian, actor, and film director
 Tiffany Poon, 2014, classical pianist and Youtuber
 Allyson Young Schwartz, 1966, former Member of Congress
 Faith Seidenberg, 1923, former lawyer and activist 
 Ben Stiller, 1983, American comedian, actor, and film director
 Wendy Wasserstein, 1967, former playwright and author

References

External links 

 
 Admissions Office

Private K-12 schools in Manhattan
West End Avenue
Upper West Side
Educational institutions established in 1896
1896 establishments in New York City